Gentlemen & Assassins was a New York-based music project, whose members were: composer and guitarist Elyas Khan of Berlin, Sxip Shirey of New York, and Brian Viglione of the Dresden Dolls. They toured in Europe, including a show at Theater Dortmund with Sonic Youth and Dresden Dolls producer Martin Bisi After releasing their first album Mother Says We're Innocent, the group disbanded in 2012.

Discography

Albums

Singles

References

External links
Official Facebook
Gentlemen and Assassins on Bandcamp

Musical groups from New York (state)